Official PlayStation Magazine (Ireland) was a TP Media monthly gaming publication.

History
The magazine was conceived by TP Media. Ireland's large PlayStation adoption rate and the greatly increased prices of imported UK publications at the time were contributing factors in launching such a magazine. The Official UK PlayStation Magazine published by Future Publishing could cost up to £9.99 IEP due to Irish import fees.

OIPM launched for £4.99 with a demo disc.

Differences between the UK version
Although the first three issues of the magazine had the same cover as the UK magazine, OIPM's content was original and written by a team in Ireland, headed by Kevin MacDermot. Certain features were directly taken from the UK version. The magazine's A-Z section was also taken from the UK version, although all future entries were based on OIPM's reviews, not the UK ones.

References

2000 establishments in Ireland
Defunct computer magazines
Defunct magazines published in Ireland
English-language video game magazines
Magazines published in Ireland
Magazines established in 2000
Magazines with year of disestablishment missing
Monthly magazines published in Ireland
PlayStation (brand) magazines